The Torrey C. Brown Rail Trail (TCB), the official name of the Northern Central Railroad (NCR) Trail, is a rail trail that runs along an abandoned railroad corridor where the Northern Central Railway once operated. The trail extends 19.7 miles from Ashland Road in Cockeysville, Maryland to the boundary with Pennsylvania. At the Pennsylvania line, the Torrey C. Brown Trail becomes the York County Heritage Rail Trail (part of BicyclePA Route J) and continues to the city of York.

Popular activities on the trail include horseback riding, jogging, walking, hiking, fishing and biking. It is open to the public from sunrise to sunset, seven days a week throughout the year. The trail is also pet-friendly as long as the pet is on a leash.

The TCB makes up a segment of the East Coast Greenway, a 3,000 mile long system of trails connecting Maine to Florida.

Historical development

Historical significance
The Northern Central Railway, built in 1832, ran between Baltimore, Maryland, and Sunbury, Pennsylvania, and was one of the oldest rail lines in the country. The railway serviced the growing Baltimore, York and Harrisburg industries, had 46 stops, 22 of which were in Maryland, and operated for 140 years. It carried passengers, people vacationing at Bentley Springs, and freight between Baltimore and York or Harrisburg, Pennsylvania. During the Civil War, the Pennsylvania Railroad-controlled Northern Central served as a major transportation route for supplies, food, clothing, and material, as well as troops heading to the South from Camp Curtin and other Northern military training stations.

Already in financial trouble, the NCR ceased operations between Cockeysville and York in 1972 after Hurricane Agnes battered its bridges. The old bed, which was converted to a rail-trail in 1984, can still be seen today. Historical markers can be found along the trail such as the Monkton Train Station that underwent renovations and is now serving as a museum, gift shop, and ranger station.

History and evolution
In the early 1980s when it was proposed to place the hike and bike trail in the place of the train tracks, a contentious battle raged between property owners and the state. The owners contended that the property was taken under eminent domain for the purpose of train tracks, and that once the property was no longer to be used for a train the property rights should revert to the previous land owners.

The state prevailed in its fight for the property and the Maryland Department of Natural Resources converted the corridor into a trail which opened to the public in 1984. The trail is used by hundreds of people daily by bicycle, foot and horse. The trail also provides access to the Gunpowder River and Loch Raven watershed for boating and fishing. In honor of Dr. Torrey C. Brown's unconditional support for the trail, it was renamed the Torrey C. Brown Rail Trail, after the third Secretary of the Maryland Department of Natural Resources, in 2007.

Trail development

Design and construction
The majority of the trail’s nearly 20 miles is 10 feet wide with a smooth surface of crushed limestone.  The trail is wheel-chair accessible.  Mile 0 of the Trail is located just off Maryland Route 145 (Ashland Road), where the road's name changes to Paper Mill Road, in a small subdivision, where there is a small parking lot.  A larger parking lot is located less than a mile north of Mile 0 on Paper Mill Road, and additional parking lots exist along the length of the trail.
Warning signals, mileage markers, signals, and railroad signs are placed throughout the trail to warn and ensure the safety of trail goers.

Trail amenities
Amenities include drinking fountains, picnic tables, benches, and portable restrooms. Within a mile of the trail, there are hotels and motels and there is easy access to a bike shop that rents and repairs bikes. In addition to the renovations to the Monkton Station, there is also the Sparks Bank Nature Center, in Sparks, Maryland.

Community

Trail supporters
The Torrey C. Brown Trail is managed and maintained by the Maryland Department of Natural Resources, a state government agency.  The Maryland Park Service's volunteer program is in charge of recruiting volunteers to invest their time in the many trails throughout the state of Maryland.  The trail receives state and federal funding as well as donations.

Special events
There are different events hosted every month put together by the Maryland Department of Natural Resources, as well as from outside institutions. Topics include local archaeological and plant-life investigations, night-time bike-rides, inner tubing, and a marathon.

References

External links
The Northern Central & York County Heritage Trails
The Northern Central Railroad Trail page at RailsToTrails.us
Northern Central Rail Trail photos
Northern Central Rail Trail Images and Information

East Coast Greenway
Rail trails in Maryland
Parks in Baltimore County, Maryland
Protected areas of Baltimore County, Maryland
Protected areas of York County, Pennsylvania
Transportation in Baltimore County, Maryland